LinuxFest Northwest is an annual technology conference and expo held in Bellingham, Washington.  It is a Saturday and Sunday weekend event held in late April or early May.  The event is dedicated to discussion and development of the Linux operating system and other free and open-source software projects.

Event description 

LinuxFest Northwest is a free event, focused on generating interest in Linux and other Open source software projects. During the event, conference attendees listen to several presentations and make contact with several companies and non-profit organizations that share an interest in open-source software. The event raises money through a raffle and by charging commercial vendors a donation fee for their booths. This allows the festival to stay free for all who wish to come while raising enough money to fly in popular speakers.

Location 

Linuxfest Northwest is held in Bellingham, Washington, about 80 miles (128.75 km) north of Seattle and 50 mi (80 km) south of Vancouver, B.C. The location is primarily chosen because the facilities are donated by Bellingham Technical College. There have been discussions in the past to move the festival south to Seattle, however no local groups have taken on the task.

History 

LinuxFest Northwest originated as "Linuxfest", held by the Bellingham Linux Users Group (BLUG). The first 'fest' was held in 2000, but was mainly advertised as a local Bellingham event. In 2003, the fest was expanded to a regional event, advertising as far south as Seattle and Tacoma, Washington, and north to Vancouver, British Columbia. Until 2006, it was a full day on Saturday. In 2007 it was expanded into a 2-day weekend event. The 2020, 2021, and 2022 conferences were either cancelled or moved online in response to the COVID-19 pandemic.

Previous featured speakers 
 2010
 Brian "Krow" Aker — Drizzle
 Jesse Keating — Fedora Developers conference
 Brian Alseth — ACLU Technology and Freedom

 2009
 Joe Brockmeier — Building Packages, Distros, and More
 Jon "maddog" Hall — How Free and Open Source Software will have World Domination
 Jesse Keating — What's under the hat? A sneak peek at Fedora 11!
 Seth Schoen — Information security discovers physics
 "Monty" Widenius — AskMonty & Black Vodka

 2008
 Brian "Krow" Aker — Caching via libmemcached
 Joe Brockmeier — A Look at KDE4
 Mel Chua — OLPC: Education in the classroom worldwide
 Brian Hatch — Network Protocols Illuminated
 Jesse Keating — Fedora 9 Sneak Peek
 Rob Lanphier — Hijinks and tomfoolery on the 3D Internet

 2007
 Brian "Krow" Aker — How Sites Scale Out
 chromatic — The Present and Phuture of Parrot
 Crispin Cowen — Securing Linux Systems with AppArmor
 Karl Fogel — 3 Centuries of Open Source & Copyright
 Jesse Keating — One Laptop Per Child
 Allison Randal — Parrot: a VM for Dynamic Languages
 Karen Sandler — Software Patents

 2006
 Tim Bray — Open Problems in Network Computing
 Greg DeKoenigsberg — Fedora and Community Building
 Charles Ditzel — Twelve Reasons To Use NetBeans
 George Dyson — Turing's Cathedral
 Jim McQuillan — The Linux Terminal Server Project
 Danny O'Brien — Incoming! What's on the EFF's Radar

 2005
 Brian "Krow" Aker — State of the Dolphin
 Chris DiBona — Google Open Source Update
 George Dyson — Von Neumann's Universe
 Chuck Gray — Impact of Linux
 Brian Hatch — The Command Line is for Everyone!
 Dee-Ann LeBlanc — Linux for Dummies

 2004
 Charles Ditzel — Java 2004 : Java and Linux
 Chuck Gray — Linux Solutions for Business
 Brian Hatch — Linux Security
 Dee-Ann LeBlanc — Bringing Mainstream Games to Linux
 Rasmus Lerdorf — PHP from the Source
 Chris Negus — Fedora/Red Hat Troubleshooting

References

External links 
 LinuxFest Northwest - Official Website
 LinuxFest Northwest 2007 Looms

Linux conferences
Recurring events established in 1999
Bellingham, Washington